Niigiyama Tadashi (born Tadashi Nagano; January 5, 1940 - September 5, 1986) was a sumo wrestler from Gifu, Japan. He made his professional debut in March 1955, and reached the top division in March 1961. He left the sumo world upon retirement from active competition in May 1963.

Career record
The Kyushu tournament was first held in 1957, and the Nagoya tournament in 1958.

See also
Glossary of sumo terms
List of past sumo wrestlers
List of sumo tournament second division champions

References

1940 births
Japanese sumo wrestlers
Sumo people from Gifu Prefecture
1986 deaths